The 1878 Waipa by-election was a by-election held on 24 July 1878 during the 6th New Zealand Parliament in the electorate of  in the Waikato.

The by-election was caused by the resignation of the incumbent MP Alfred Cox on 13 June 1878.
  
The by-election was won by Edward Graham McMinn, described as a Government supporter. Special trains ran from Auckland to Mercer to poll the Auckland voters, with 60 to 70 availing themselves of this conveyance.

Frederick Alexander Whitaker opposed the government of George Grey. There were reportedly "nearly forty natives on the roll, besides some ninety votes about Auckland" (for whom the nearest polling booth was Newcastle).

Results
The following table gives the election result. Note that the Returning officer (in The New Zealand Herald report) had 243 votes for Whitaker and a majority for McMinn of 41; another report from the Otago Witness has 245 and 39 but does give subtotals by booth:

Notes

Waipa 1878
1878 elections in New Zealand
July 1878 events
Politics of Waikato